Grown Ups is an American sitcom that aired on the UPN network from August 23, 1999 to May 22, 2000. Starring Jaleel White, the series was created by Matthew Miller and based on a story written by White.

Plot
Grown Ups follows the lives of three post-college friends who are coming to terms with adulthood. J. Calvin Frazier is a 24-year-old man whose roommate just left town nearly leaving him homeless. J. also learns that his high school crush Melissa (Tammy Townsend) is engaged to another man. With the help of his best friend Gordon (Dave Ruby) and Gordon's wife Shari (Marissa Ribisi), J. attempts to deal with his problems and adjust to life as a grown up.

In the pilot episode, Soleil Moon Frye appeared as Robin Carlucci, J.'s new roommate who wrongly assumes that J. is gay. The series was retooled after the pilot and Frye's character was dropped.

Cast

Main
Jaleel White as J. Calvin Frazier
Dave Ruby as Gordon Hammel
Marissa Ribisi as Shari Hammel

Recurring
Patrick Bristow as Rodney Caruthers
Bumper Robinson as Marcus Wentworth
Tammy Townsend as Melissa

Reception
Grown Ups premiered on August 23, 1999 at 8:30 EST/7:30 CST. On August 30, 1999, the series moved to Mondays at 9p.m. EST/8p.m. CST, following the Moesha spin-off The Parkers. The series initially garnered good ratings, but ratings soon dropped and UPN canceled the series (on a cliffhanger that was never resolved) in May 2000.

Episodes

References

External links
  
 

1999 American television series debuts
2000 American television series endings
1990s American black sitcoms
2000s American black sitcoms
1990s American sitcoms
2000s American sitcoms
English-language television shows
UPN original programming
Television series by Sony Pictures Television
 Television shows set in Chicago